The diagonal band of Broca is one of the basal forebrain structures that are derived from the ventral telencephalon during development. This structure forms the medial margin of the anterior perforated substance. This brain region was described by the French neuroanatomist Paul Broca.

Structure
It consists of fibers that are said to arise in the parolfactory area, the gyrus subcallosus and the anterior perforated substance, and course backward in the longitudinal striae to the dentate gyrus and the hippocampal region.

This is a cholinergic bundle of nerve fibers posterior to the anterior perforated substance. It interconnects the subcallosal gyrus in the septal area with the hippocampus and lateral olfactory area.

Nuclei
Two structures are often described in this brain regions, namely the nuclei of the vertical and horizontal limbs of the diagonal band of Broca (nvlDBB and nhlDBB, respectively). nvlDBB projects to the hippocampal formation through the fornix and it is the second largest assembly of cholinergic neurons in the basal forebrain whereas nhlDBB projects to the olfactory bulb and it does not have a significant population of cholinergic neurons.

Function
Along with the septum pellucidum and medial septal nucleus, the diagonal band of Broca is believed to be involved in the generation of theta waves in the hippocampus. It also inhibits magnocellular neurosecretory cells via GABA interneurons.

Its behavior can be altered by nerve growth factor.

Pathology 
A significant nvlDBB neuronal loss is seen in Lewy body dementia.

References

Rostral basal ganglia and associated structures